The PAP European Sportsperson of the Year is an annual sports award presented by Polish Press Agency (PAP). Both male and female athletes are considered for the award by a panel of 27 international news agencies. The winner is announced each year on the second Christmas Day.

History
It was founded by Włodzimierz Źróbik and has been awarded annually since 1958. The European Sportsperson of the Year award honours the sportsperson deemed to have performed the best over the previous year, based on voting by 27 international news agencies. The inaugural winner of the award was Olympic gold medallist Zdzisław Krzyszkowiak who specialized in the 3000 metre steeplechase.

The 27 agencies that are part of the panel are: EFE (Spain) France Presse (France), Agerpress (Romania), ANP (Netherlands), APA (Austria), ATA (Albania), Belga (Belgium), Belta (Belarus), BTA (Bulgaria), CTK (Czech Republic), DPA (Germany), Elta (Lithuania), FENA (Bosnia and Herzegovina), HINA (Croatia), LETA (Latvia), Lusa (Portugal), Moldpres (Moldova), SDA-ATS (Switzerland), SHGSK (Kosovo), SID (Germany), Sita (Slovakia), STA (Slovenia), Tanjug (Serbia), TASS (Russia), Ukrinform (Ukraine) and PAP (Poland).

The most wins are held by representatives of track and field sports (24), followed by tennis (14) and Formula 1 (9). Roger Federer is the most successful individual winner with five victories, followed by Novak Djokovic with four victories, while Valeriy Brumel and Michael Schumacher hold three victories each. In 2005, Roger Federer and Yelena Isinbayeva were declared joint winners. So far, 47 male and 17 female athletes received the title of PAP European Sportsperson of the Year.

Winners 1958-2010

List of past winners from 1958-2010: Zdzisław Krzyszkowiak (Poland, 1958), Vasili Kuznetsov (USSR, 1959), Yury Vlasov (USSR, 1960), Valeriy Brumel (USSR, 1961, 1962, 1963), Lidiya Skoblikova (USSR, 1964), Michel Jazy (France, 1965), Irena Kirszenstein (Poland, 1966), Jean-Claude Killy (France, 1967, 1968), Eddy Merckx (Belgium, 1969, 1970), Juha Väätäinen (Finland, 1971), Lasse Virén (Finland, 1972), Kornelia Ender (East Germany, 1973), Irena Szewińska (Poland, 1974), Kornelia Ender (East Germany, 1975), Nadia Comăneci (Romania, 1976), Rosemarie Ackermann (East Germany, 1977), Vladimir Yashchenko (USSR, 1978), Sebastian Coe (Great Britain, 1979), Vladimir Salnikov (USSR, 1980), Sebastian Coe (Great Britain, 1981), Daley Thompson (Great Britain, 1982), Jarmila Kratochvílová (Czechoslovakia, 1983), Michael Gross (West Germany, 1984), Sergey Bubka (USSR, 1985), Heike Drechsler (East Germany, 1986), Stephen Roche (Ireland, 1987), Steffi Graf (West Germany, 1988, 1989), Stefan Edberg (Sweden, 1990), Katrin Krabbe (Germany, 1991), Nigel Mansell (Great Britain, 1992), Linford Christie (Great Britain 1993), Johann Olav Koss (Norway, 1994), Jonathan Edwards (Great Britain, 1995), Svetlana Masterkova (Russia, 1996), Martina Hingis (Switzerland, 1997), Mika Häkkinen (Finland, 1998), Gabriela Szabo (Romania, 1999), Inge de Bruijn (Netherlands, 2000), Michael Schumacher (Germany, 2001, 2002, 2003), Roger Federer (2004), Roger Federer and Yelena Isinbayeva (Switzerland and Russia 2005), Roger Federer (Switzerland, 2006, 2007), Rafael Nadal (Spain, 2008), Roger Federer (Switzerland, 2009), Rafael Nadal (Spain, 2010).

Winners since 2011

Winners by country

See also
European Athlete of the Year

Notes

References

Awards established in 1958
European sports trophies and awards
International awards
1958 establishments in Europe